Beyond the Rain is an album by American jazz saxophonist Chico Freeman recorded in 1977 and released on the Contemporary label.

Reception
Allmusic awarded the album 4½ stars with Scott Yanow calling it "one of tenor saxophonist Chico Freeman's best early efforts... Fine music from the flexible tenor man".

Track listing
All compositions by Chico Freeman except as indicated
 "Two Over One" (Muhal Richard Abrams) - 7:40   
 "Beyond The Rain" - 3:30   
 "Excerpts" (Abrams) - 7:20   
 "My One and Only Love" (Guy Wood, Robert Mellin) - 7:50   
 "Pepe's Samba" - 14:50

Personnel
Chico Freeman - tenor saxophone, flute
Hilton Ruiz - piano
Joony Booth - bass
Elvin Jones - drums
Jumma Santos - percussion

References 

Contemporary Records albums
Chico Freeman albums
1978 albums